Handyala Lakshminarayanaswamy Dattu  (born 3 December 1950) is a former Chief Justice of India, and the former chairman of the National Human Rights Commission. As the chief justice, he served for nearly 14 months, from 28 September 2014 to 2 December 2015. Before his elevation as a judge of the Supreme Court of India on 17 December 2008; he had served as the Chief Justice of the Kerala High Court and the Chhattisgarh High Court.

Early life and education
Handyala Lakshminarayanaswamy Dattu was born in Chikkapattanagere village in Chikmagalur district of Mysore State (present-day Karnataka). His father H L Narayanaswamy was an English teacher. He completed his early education in Kadur, Tarikere, and Birur, before moving to Bengaluru where he completed his Bachelor of Laws.

Career

As a lawyer
Dattu was enrolled as an advocate at the bar on 23 October 1975. He practised at Bengaluru in civil, criminal, constitutional, and taxation matters. He appeared as government counsel in the Karnataka High court for the sales tax department from 1983 to 1990, government advocate from 1990 to 1993, standing counsel for the income tax department from 1992 to 1993, and a senior standing counsel for the Income Tax department from 1993 to 1995.

As a judge
Dattu was appointed a judge of the Karnataka High Court on 18 December 1995. Thereafter, on 12 February 2007; he was elevated as Chief Justice of the Chhattisgarh High Court. On 18 May 2007, he was transferred to head the Kerala High Court. On 5 September 2014, the President of India had appointed Dattu as the next Chief Justice of India, on the recommendation of CJI Rajendra Mal Lodha. On 28 September 2014, he was sworn in as the 42nd Chief Justice of India. He held the post for a little over a year until his retirement on 2 December 2015, on turning 65 years of age – one of the longest tenures for a CJI in recent years.

In February 2014, Dattu was nominated by then CJI P Sathasivam as the CJI's nominee to the five-membered panel to appoint the Lokpal. He is the visitor of Hidayatullah National Law University, Raipur.

In February 2016, Dattu began serving as the chairperson of the National Human Rights Commission of India.

Personal life
Dattu is a connoisseur of Carnatic music. He is known for his hard work and, is considered as a disciplinarian.

Allegations

Dattu had corruption charges levelled against him before he became chief justice. Justice Katju has taken up the issue in his blog posts, where he called for Dattu's impeachment on charges of corruption.

Dattu was also involved in controversy after he asked for the names of whistleblowers to be revealed in the 2G spectrum case.

References

External links

1950 births
Living people
20th-century Indian judges
20th-century Indian lawyers
21st-century Indian judges
21st-century Indian lawyers
Chief justices of India
Chief Justices of Chhattisgarh High Court
Chief Justices of the Kerala High Court
Judges of the Karnataka High Court
Justices of the Supreme Court of India
Kannada people
People from Chikkamagaluru district
Recipients of the Rajyotsava Award 2018